Melakhino is a rural locality (a selo) in Kovalyovskoye Rural Settlement, Liskinsky District, Voronezh Oblast, Russia. The population was 61 as of 2010. There are 2 streets.

Geography 
Melakhino is located 35 km southwest of Liski (the district's administrative centre) by road. Misevo is the nearest rural locality.

References 

Rural localities in Liskinsky District